Palakion (Παλάκιον), according to Strabo, was a Scythian fortress in the steppes of Crimea. The only information about it is from an inscription on the gravestone of a dweller of Chersonesos who died in a battle at the walls of Palakion.

Strabo suggests that Palakion,  Chabon and Scythian Neapolis  were named after sons of Scythian ruler Skilurus (Palakus, in the case of Palakion).

Peter Simon Pallas speculated that the name of Balaklava is a corruption of 'Palakion' and identified the two places. There is no historical evidence to this.

References

Ancient Crimea
Iranian archaeological sites
Scythians